Nutrition and Education International (NEI) is a non-partisan, non-profit 501(c) 3 organization based in Pasadena, California. NEI was formed in 2003 by Dr. Steven Kwon to fight widespread malnutrition among women and children who live in high-mortality areas in Afghanistan.  NEI is supported and run by volunteers who work full-time in various professional fields and donate their time and expertise to bring proper nutrition to impoverished communities in Afghanistan.

References

External links 
 

Malnutrition organizations